Sultanpur Sadar is a constituency of the Uttar Pradesh Legislative Assembly covering the city of Sultanpur in the Sultanpur district of Uttar Pradesh, India.

Sultanpur Sadar is one of five assembly constituencies in the Sultanpur Lok Sabha constituency. Since 2008, this assembly constituency is numbered 189 amongst 403 constituencies.

Currently this seat belongs to Bharatiya Janta Party candidate Sitaram who won in last Assembly election of 2017 Uttar Pradesh Legislative Elections defeating Bahujan Samaj Party candidate Raj Prasad Upadhyay by a margin of 18,773 votes.

References

External links
 

Assembly constituencies of Uttar Pradesh
Sultanpur, Uttar Pradesh